Berestia, is the part of Belarusian, Ukrainian, and Polish ethnic territory, bounded by the Bug River, Pripyat River, Yaselda River, and Narew (Narva) River, and a borderland between historical Podlachia and the Land of Brest-Litovsk part of Polesia.

Cities
Its main cities were Berestia, Bilsk, Dorohychyn, Kobryn and Kamyanyets.

Leadership
Princes of Berestia (Brest)
 Sviatoslav Mstislavich  (1170–1173)
 Vsevolod Mstislavich (1187-1188)
Vasilko Romanovich (1221–1231)

History

The city was founded by Lithuanians and was called Lithuanian Brasta. As a town, Brest – Berestye in Kievan Rus – was first mentioned in the Primary Chronicle in 1019. It became part of the Grand Duchy of Lithuania, was laid waste by the Mongols in 1241 (see: Mongol invasion of Europe), and was not rebuilt until 1275.

In the second part of the 12th century Berestia became the center of the small feudal duchy called Land of Berestia which was part of Kingdom of Galicia–Volhynia. In 1164 the Lithuanian Duke Skirmunt took Berestia but did not own it for a long time. Attempts in 1179 and 1182 by the Polish High Duke (or King) Kazimierz II to join Berestia to Poland were unsuccessful.

In 1213 the Polish High Duke or King, Leszko occupied Berestia but in 1222 Volhynian Duke Vasilka, who was Prince of Brest 1221-31, gained control of all Berestia. In the beginning of the 13th century the troops of the Polish High Duke (or King) Konrad Mazowiecki occupied the city of Brest but the population of Berestia resisted and the king had to return the city to the Kingdom of Galicia–Volhynia. In the middle of the 13th century the Berestia Land was invaded by the Mongols. Little if any historical information exists about the depredation of Berestia by these invaders, but sources report that Brest was not rebuilt until 1275. The Mongols, somewhat weakened by fighting with the Slavonic Duchies and finding little of the wide pasturage needed for the maintenance of the vast horse herds that were an integral part of their military formations, did not move further into Europe. Brest was besieged by enemies many times; more than once the town was put to the torch, but each time it was reconstructed.
To defend their territories from invaders the Slavonic dukes built fortification castles and towers. In the 12th century a castle and a fortification to harbor the trade caravans that passed through Berestia were built in the city. Brest served as a customs port where the merchants paid taxes on the goods they carried. In 1276 the Wolyn Duke (or Prince) Wlodzimierz Vasilkovich (Vladimir Vasilkovich) erected a castle with a high stone tower, or keep, in the city. He also ordered the construction of another tower on the Lyasnaya (also: Liasnaja, Lysna, or Leśna) river in the forests of Bialowierza Puszcza, to defend the northern territories of his duchy. The city of Kamienec (or Kamianiec) soon appeared in the primeval forest near this second tower. The tower in Kamienec still stands today as a witness to these events.

To the North of Berestia, the Lithuanian-Belarusian state known as the Grand Duchy of Lithuania was emerging. This state appeared on the territories of Baltic tribes half-assimilated with Slavs. The rulers of Lithuania managed to escape subjugation to the neighboring Russian Kniazes (Princes or Dukes), and thus the Grand Duchy continued growing and getting stronger. Beginning with the end of the 12th century the Lithuanian territories were attacked by Crusaders (specifically, the Teutonic Knights), who wanted to subdue both the Baltic and the Russian territories. To resist the Crusaders' threat, a peace treaty between Russian and Lithuanian dukes was signed in 1219.

From 1080 to 1150 the land belonged to the Principality of Turov and Pinsk (Turiv-Pynske) {Turów, Pinsk}, later to the Kingdom of Galicia–Volhynia, and after 1320 to the Grand Duchy of Lithuania as part of the Trakai Voivodeship. From 1569 to 1795 it constituted the Podlaskie Voivodeship and Brest Litovsk Voivodeship of the Polish–Lithuanian Commonwealth. After the third partition of the Commonwealth (1795), the territory was annexed to the Russian Empire.

References

   Довідник з історії України.За ред. І.Підкови та Р.Шуста.- К.: Генеза, 1993 Том 1_б
 Ukrainian Soviet Encyclopedia / Ed. М.  preferable; 2nd edition. — К., 1974-1985. - K., 1974-1985.
 Shvarn

Historical regions in Belarus